The JMU Convocation Center is a 6,426-seat multi-purpose arena in Harrisonburg, Virginia. The arena opened in 1982, and was home to the James Madison Dukes men's basketball and James Madison Dukes women's basketball teams through the 2019–20 season. It hosted the 1984 ECAC South men's basketball tournament (now known as the Colonial Athletic Association).

It was one of the rotating host venues for the CAA women's basketball tournament, having hosted the tournament six times since 1987. JMU's University Program Board (UPB) hosts concerts at the Convocation center each semester. Past concerts have included: The Kinks, Third Eye Blind, Jason Derulo, Wale, Wiz Khalifa, Macklemore, and Big Sean. The Convocation Center also hosts numerous other functions including the winter commencement ceremony.

The Convocation Center hosted its last basketball games in February 2020. The Dukes moved into the 8,500-seat Atlantic Union Bank Center for the 2020–21 season. The Convocation Center is slated to be converted into practice facilities for various Dukes teams.

References

Defunct college basketball venues in the United States
Basketball venues in Virginia
James Madison Dukes basketball